2008 ACC tournament may refer to:

 2008 ACC men's basketball tournament
 2008 ACC women's basketball tournament
 2008 ACC men's soccer tournament
 2008 ACC women's soccer tournament
 2008 Atlantic Coast Conference baseball tournament
 2008 Atlantic Coast Conference softball tournament